Sculeni (Skulen) is a commune in Ungheni District, Moldova. It is composed of four villages: Blindești, Floreni, Gherman and Sculeni.

It is also a border checkpoint to Romania.

History
The town had an important Jewish community before World War II to such an extent that a Hasidic dynasty is designated after its name, the Skulen Hasidic dynasty.

In June 1941, hundreds of Jews from the area were murdered in mass executions perpetrated by a death squad of Romanian troops.

Natives
 Andrei Eșanu, historian
 Eliezer Zusia Portugal, rabbi
 Yisroel Avrohom Portugal, rabbi
 Grigore Sturdza, politician and adventurer
 Wincenty (Morari), metropolitan

Gallery

Literature
Sculeni (battle of Sculeni) is mentioned by Alexander Pushkin in his short story The Shot.

See also
 Battle of Sculeni
 Sculeni, Iaşi
 Skulen (Hasidic dynasty)

References

Communes of Ungheni District
Moldova–Romania border crossings
Populated places on the Prut
Beletsky Uyezd